Glory Odiase (born 15 September 1993) is a Nigerian professional cyclist. She won a gold medal while representing Nigeria in the women's time trial cycling event alongside Happiness Okafor, Rosemary Marcus, and Gripa Tombrapa at the 2015 All-Africa Games in Congo Brazzaville.

References

External links

1993 births
Living people
Cyclists from Rivers State
Nigerian female cyclists
Sportswomen from Rivers State
African Games gold medalists for Nigeria
African Games medalists in cycling
Competitors at the 2015 African Games
20th-century Nigerian women
21st-century Nigerian women